Płoki  is a village in the administrative district of Gmina Trzebinia, within Chrzanów County, Lesser Poland Voivodeship, in southern Poland. The village is located in the historical region Galicia.

The village has a population of 962.

References

External links 

Villages in Chrzanów County